Jane Gray may refer to:
Jane Gray (stained glass artist) (born 1931), British stained glass artist
Jane Gray (supercentenarian) (1901–2014), Scottish Australian supercentenarian
Jane Gray (broadcaster) (1896–1984), one of the first female broadcasters in Canadian radio
Jane Nelson (Jane Gray Nelson, born 1951), Texas politician
Lady Jane Gray, misspelling of Lady Jane Grey
Jane Gray Muskie, spouse of Edmund Muskie, 1968 Democratic vice-presidential nominee

See also
Jane Grey (disambiguation)
Jean Grey, a fictional superhero appearing Marvel Comics